The 1946 North Dakota Fighting Sioux football team, also known as the Nodaks, was an American football team that represented the University of North Dakota in the North Central Conference (NCC) during the 1946 college football season. In its second year under head coach Red Jarrett, the team compiled a 5–3 record (2–2 against NCC opponents) and outscored opponents by a total of 137 to 110. The team played its home games at Memorial Stadium in Grand Forks, North Dakota.

Schedule

References

North Dakota
North Dakota Fighting Hawks football seasons
North Dakota Fighting Sioux football